German submarine U-850 was a long-range Type IXD2 U-boat built for Nazi Germany's Kriegsmarine during World War II.

Design
German Type IXD2 submarines were considerably larger than the original Type IXs. U-850 had a displacement of  when at the surface and  while submerged. She had two shafts and two  propellers.

U-850 was fitted with six  torpedo tubes (four fitted at the bow and two at the stern), 24 torpedoes, one  SK C/32 naval gun, 150 rounds, and a  SK C/30 with 2575 rounds as well as two  C/30 anti-aircraft guns with 8100 rounds. The boat had a complement of fifty-five.

Service history
The U-boat was ordered on 20 January 1941 and laid down at the DESCHIMAG AG Weser shipyard on 17 March 1942. Assigned yard number 1056, she was launched on 7 December of that year. Commissioned on 17 April 1943 under the command of Korvettenkapitän Klaus Ewerth (Crew 25), who had previously commanded . U-850 served with the 4th U-boat Flotilla until the end of October when she transferred to the 12th U-boat Flotilla for front-line service.

Fate
On 20 December 1943, while en route to the Indian Ocean, U-850 was spotted by aircraft of Squadron VC-19. The first aircraft, an Avenger piloted by Lieutenant W.A. La Fleur, attacked the U-boat with depth charges which missed their target. After La Fleur reported the sighting via radio, two Wildcats accompanied by two more Avengers - T18 and T19 - arrived on the scene. While the Wildcats strafed U-850, T19, piloted by Ensign G.C. Goodwin, made another attack with depth charges which hit their target. The U-boat tried to evade by crash diving, but T18, piloted by Lieutenant H.G. Bradshaw, dropped two FIDO torpedoes, which both hit the U-boat on the starboard side.  and  later recovered some bodies, body parts, and pieces of wreckage. There were no survivors.

Successes
U-850 did not sink or damage any ships while in service.

References

Bibliography

External links

World War II submarines of Germany
German Type IX submarines
Ships built in Bremen (state)
1942 ships
U-boats commissioned in 1943
U-boats sunk in 1943
Ships lost with all hands
World War II shipwrecks in the South Atlantic
U-boats sunk by depth charges
U-boats sunk by US aircraft
Maritime incidents in December 1943